Max Rössler (born 1940) is a Swiss investor and patron.

Life 
Rössler attended the Kantonsschule at Burggraben in St. Gallen, where he finished his matriculation. He then studied mathematics at ETH Zurich, where he co-authored a dissertation on railway computations in the field of space mechanics in 1966 with Eduard Stiefel. He then spent time at Harvard University in Cambridge, Massachusetts, for a NASA research project to calculate space travel. Subsequently, he was a lecturer for applied mathematics and operations research at ETH Zurich.

In 1978 Rössler changed to finances. He was responsible for the analysis department of fixed interest investments and the management of investment funds of CHF 12 billion at the Schweizerische Kreditanstalt. Later he was responsible for financial investments of the Swiss Accident Insurance Institution (SUVA). He successfully used his knowledge in the financial sector for his own investments, to which a considerable amount of his assets includes investments in several Swiss companies. He is the main shareholder of the Parmino Holding AG which includes the construction company Implenia. Through his influence on the occupation of the Implenia management team, Rössler became well known to the public.

In addition, Rössler holds a major stake in the machine tool business Starrag Group and is a board member of other companies such as RSB Securities AG, Global Care and SunVesta Holding. He is also an advisor to Swiss private banks. Rössler is a member of the Board of Trustees at the Rütli Foundation, which is affiliated to the private bank Reichmuth & Co.

Rössler Prize 
His private wealth enabled him to donate largely. In 2009, Rössler funded the annual Rössler Prize for the support of outstanding young professors at the ETH Zurich. The prize money amounts to CHF 200,000. Another major donation, together with the Walter Haefner Foundation, enabled the founding of the new Institute for Theoretical Studies at ETH Zurich 2013.

Awards 
 2013: Honorary Council of the ETH Zurich

References 

20th-century Swiss mathematicians
Academic staff of ETH Zurich
Swiss investors
ETH Zurich alumni
Patrons of the arts
1940 births
Living people